Mackay may refer to:

Clan Mackay, the Scottish clan from which the surname "MacKay" derives

Mackay may also refer to:
.    Or it might refer to McKay from south park

Places

Australia
 Mackay Region, a local government area
 Mackay, Queensland, a city in the above region
 Mackay Airport, in the above city
 Mackay railway station
 Electoral district of Mackay, Queensland, Australia

Canada
 Fort MacKay, Alberta
 MacKay, Alberta
 A. Murray MacKay Bridge, in Halifax, Nova Scotia

United States
 Mackay, Idaho, a city in Custer County

People and fictional characters
 Aeneas James George Mackay (1839–1911), a Scottish lawyer and historical writer
 Charles Mackay (1814–1889), Scottish poet
 Derek Mackay (born 1977), SNP politician
 George Robert Aberigh-Mackay (1848–1881), Anglo-Indian writer
 Shena Mackay (born 1944), Scottish author
 McKay as surname (list of people)
 McKay (given name)

Other
Mackay Trophy, named in honour of Clarence Mackay, awarded annually by the US Air Force for the "Most Meritorious Flight"
Mackays, now known as M&Co., a United Kingdom chainstore
Mackay Pianos, see John Mackay (industrialist)

See also
Lake Mackay (disambiguation)
 Mackey (disambiguation)
 Mackeys (disambiguation) 
 McKay (disambiguation)
 McKey (disambiguation)
 All pages beginning with Mackay 
 All pages beginning with Mckay